Ahana is an Indian actress who predominantly works in the Tamil film industry. She has also acted in Malayalam and Kannada films.

Film career
Ahana made her debut in Tamil movie Aranmanai Kili which was released in 1993. Her Malayalam movie debut was The City in 1994.

Filmography

References 

Actresses in Tamil cinema
Tamil actresses
Living people
Actresses in Telugu cinema
20th-century Indian actresses
Indian film actresses
Actresses in Malayalam cinema
Actresses in Kannada cinema
Year of birth missing (living people)